Wilfrid Hounkpatin (born 29 July 1991) is a French rugby union player. His position is prop and he currently plays for Castres in the Top 14.

References

External links
France profile at FFR
Castres profile

1991 births
Living people
French rugby union players
Castres Olympique players
Rugby union props
France international rugby union players